Atractidae is a family of nematodes belonging to the order Rhabditida.

Genera
Genera:

 Atractis Dujardin, 1845
 Buckleyatractis Khalil & Gibbons, 1988
 Cobboldina Leiper, 1911
 Crossocephalus Railliet, 1909
 Cyrtosomum Gedoelst, 1919
 Diceronema Gibbons, Knapp & Krecek, 1996
 Fitzsimmonsnema Petter, 1966
 Grassenema Petter, 1959
 Klossinemella Gonçalves da Costa, 1961
 Labeonema Puylaert, 1970
 Labiduris Schneider, 1866
 Leiperenia Khalil, 1922
 Monhysterides Baylis & Daubney, 1922
 Nouvelnema Petter, 1959
 Orientatractis Petter, 1966
 Paraorientatractis Gibbons, Khalil & Marinkelle, 1997
 Paratractis Gupta & Naiyer, 1989
 Pneumoatractis Bursey, Reavill & Greiner, 2009
 Podocnematractis Gibbons, Khalil & Marinkelle, 1995
 Probstmayria 
 Pseudocyrtosomum Gupta & Johri, 1988
 Rhinoceronema Mondal & Manna, 2013
 Rhinoclemmysnema Gibbons & Platt, 2006
 Rondonia Travassos, 1920

References

Rhabditida
Nematode families